George Gallo Jr. (born January 1, 1956) is an American screenwriter, film director, producer, painter and musician.

He is known for writing Midnight Run and 29th Street, and is an accomplished painter in the style of the Pennsylvania Impressionists. In 1990, he won the coveted Arts for the Parks award, and has had three one-man exhibitions in New York City.

In 2010, Gallo wrote and directed the film Middle Men starring Luke Wilson.

Filmography

Producer only

Other works

References

External links

1956 births
Living people
20th-century American male writers
20th-century American painters
20th-century American screenwriters
21st-century American male writers
21st-century American painters
21st-century American screenwriters
American Impressionist painters
American male painters
American male screenwriters
Film directors from New York (state)
Film producers from New York (state)
Painters from New York (state)
People from Port Chester, New York
Screenwriters from New York (state)
20th-century American male artists